Technicolor is the second album released by Gospel musical group Parachute Band. Released on October 14, 2008, the album features 11 new tracks drawing on the concept that God’s living water equals life in all its color. Technicolor debuted at #10 on the U.S. Christian/Gospel charts.

The album would later peak at #6 on the NZ album charts after the Parachute Music festival in January 2009.

Track listing

Personnel
Mark de Jong - executive producer
Nic Manders - producer
Sam de Jong - producer
Omega Levine - Vocals
Sam de Jong - drums, guitars
Alister Wood - Keys
Rhys Machell - Bass
Jeff Parsons - guitars

Charts

References

External links
 Parachute Music
 Parachute Band Myspace

2008 albums
Parachute Band albums
Albums produced by Sam de Jong